Kerala Pradesh Congress Committee is the state unit of the Indian National Congress in Kerala. The Indian National Congress currently leads the United Democratic Front alliance, the Opposition in the Kerala Legislative Assembly.

Kerala Pradesh Congress Committee was first convened in 1921 at Ottapalam in northern Kerala (in the presence of the A. I. C. C. president T. Prakasam).

Structure and composition 

 K. P. C. C. President - K. Sudhakaran
 Assembly Opposition Leader - V. D. Satheesan
 Former Chief Minister(s) - A. K. Antony and Oommen Chandy 
 Former Opposition Leader(s) - Ramesh Chennithala 
 K. P. C. C. Working Presidents - Kodikkunnil Suresh and T. Siddique

Wings 
 Youth Congress (Kerala) President - Shafi Parambil
 Kerala Students Union (K S U) (N S U I) - Aloshious Xavier
 Indian National Trade Union Congress (I N T U C)  - R. Chandrashekaran
 Mahila Congress (Kerala) State President - Jebi Mather

Timeline 

 1921 – "Kerala Pradesh Congress Committee" convened at Ottapalam in northern Kerala.
 1924/25 – Vaikom Satyagraha led by Congress leaders T. K. Madhavan, K. Kelappan and K. P. Kesava Menon.
 1930 – Salt Satyagraha, a part of the Civil Disobedience Movement, organised by K. Kelappan in northern Kerala.
 1931/32 – Guruvayur Satyagraha, commenced under K. Kelappan. 
 1933 –  Joint Political Congress established in Travancore.
 1938  – Chunangat Kunjikavamma elected as President and E. M. S. Namboodiripad, the future Communist leader, as Secretary. 
 1938 – formation of Travancore State Congress. Agitation against Diwan C. P. Ramaswami Iyer for 'Responsible Government'.
 1939/40 – Split in Congress. Communist Party of India walked away with the entire Kerala unit.
 1947 – Following the Punnapra-Vayalar Revolt, the Travancore State Congress enters the agitation against the Diwan.
 1957 – Congress loses first assembly election in Kerala
 1958 – formation of the Kerala Students Union (K S U).
 1960 – Congress-led alliance in power after the 'Liberation Struggle' against Communist ministry.
 1964 – major Split in Congress.
 1971 – Congress joins the Achuta Menon Government.
 1979/80 – Congress leader K. Karunakaran forms the U D F alliance.

Gandhi's visits to Kerala 

 1920 (during the Non-Cooperation/Khilafat Agitation)
 1925 (during Vaikom Satyagraha)
 1927 (campaign against the untouchability)
 1934 (fundraising)
 1937 (after the 1936 Temple Entry Proclamation)

Kerala Legislative Assembly election 

Source: Thomas J. Nossiter - Communism in Kerala: A Study in Political Adaptation (1982)

Source: Government of Kerala Government of India

Chief ministers 
Source: Thomas J. Nossiter - Communism in Kerala: A Study in Political Adaptation (1982)

Kerala 

 R. Sankar (1962–64)
 K. Karunakaran (1977, 1981–82, 82 - 87 and 91 - 95)
 A. K. Antony (1977–78, 95 - 96 and 2001 - 04)
 Oommen Chandy (2004–06, 2011–16)

Leaders of Opposition 

 P. T. Chacko (1957–59)
 K. Karunakaran (1967–69, 78 - 79, 80 - 81, 87 - 91)
 A. K. Antony (1996 - 2001)
 Oommen Chandy (2006–11)
 Ramesh Chennithala (2016–21)
 V. D. Satheesan (2021–present)

List of Kerala P. C. C. Presidents

List of elected members

Kerala legislature

Lok Sabha

Rajya Sabha

References

External links 
Kerala Pradesh Congress Committee
Veekshanam

Indian National Congress of Kerala
1921 establishments in India